Dick Turpin was an English highwayman.

Dick Turpin may also refer to:

People 
Dick Turpin (boxer) (1920–1990), English middleweight boxer
John Henry Turpin (1876–1962), United States Navy sailor

Other uses 
Dick Turpin (TV series), a British television series
Dick Turpin (1925 film), an American film
Dick Turpin (1933 film), a British film with Victor McLaglen
Dick Turpin (1974 film), a Spanish adventure film 
Dick Turpin (horse, foaled 1929), racehorse
Dick Turpin (horse, foaled 2007), racehorse
Dick Turpin, locomotive no. 2579 of the London & North Eastern Railway, see List of LNER Class A1/A3 locomotives

Turpin, Dick